Ambattur aeri, or Ambattur lake, is a rain-fed reservoir which reaches top levels during the monsoon seasons. In November 2008, incessant monsoon rain filled the lake and encroachments on the north and south banks of the lake were demolished. It also caters to the drinking water needs of the Chennai city after Poondi and Chembarambakkam Lake.

Ambattur aeri is one of a chain of three water bodies, including the Korattur aeri and the Madhavaram aeri, where surplus water from one is transported to another.

Biodiversity
Ambattur lake, together with the Korattur lake and the Retteri lake, is an important wildlife refuge in northern and western parts of Chennai. According to the Care Earth Trust, a city-based biodiversity research organisation, nearly 40 bird species are present in these lakes, including common tailorbird, the purple-rumped sunbird, and the migratory Asian openbill stork.

See also

Water management in Chennai

References

Lakes of Chennai
Reservoirs in Tamil Nadu